Dancing Feet is a 1936 American comedy film directed by Joseph Santley and written by Jerome Chodorov, Olive Cooper and Wellyn Totman. It is based on the 1931 novel Dancing Feet by Rob Eden. The film stars Ben Lyon, Joan Marsh, Edward Nugent, Isabel Jewell, James Burke and Purnell Pratt. The film was released on January 20, 1936, by Republic Pictures.

Plot

Cast
Edward Nugent as Jimmy Cassidy 
Joan Marsh as Judy Jones
Ben Lyon as Peyton Wells
Isabel Jewell as Mabel Henry
James Burke as Phil Moore
Purnell Pratt as Silas P. Jones
Vince Barnett as Willoughby
Nick Condos as Speciality Dancer
Herbert Rawlinson as Oliver Groves
Lillian Harmer as Aggie
Herbert Corthell as Jenkins
James P. Burtis as Stupe (as Jimmy Burtis)
Harry C. Bradley as Hotel Assistant Manager
Cy Kendall as Hotel Detective
Lynton Brent as Hotel Clerk
Wilson Benge as Silas' Butler
J. C. Edwards and Band

References

External links
 

1936 films
1930s English-language films
American comedy films
1936 comedy films
Republic Pictures films
Films directed by Joseph Santley
American black-and-white films
1930s American films